Tamar Valley Area of Outstanding Natural Beauty or Tamar Valley AONB is a legally designated Area of Outstanding Natural Beauty in Devon and Cornwall in England.

History

There has been mining in the area for hundreds of years, in 1844 a copper seam was discovered that was so big it led to a 50-year mining boom and the creation of Europe's biggest mine, Devon Great Consols. The copper ran low during the 1890s leading to mass unemployment and the emigration of surplus workers.

World Heritage site

The valley is incorporated inside the Cornwall and West Devon Mining Landscape which is a World Heritage Site. The site was added to the World Heritage List during the 30th session of the UNESCO World Heritage Committee in Vilnius, July 2006.

Location

The AONB straddles the  administrative border between Cornwall and Devon and covers around 75 square miles of the lower River Tamar below Launceston. There are four ancient towns: Launceston in the North with a steam railway and Norman castle; Tavistock to the East and adjacent to Dartmoor; Callington in the West with a mural trail, and Saltash with the Royal Albert Bridge.

Landmarks
There are numerous landmarks and listed buildings including Devon Great Consols, the Tamar Valley Line and the National Trust's Cotehele and Buckland Abbey.

Facilities

Tamar Trails
Tamar Trails is a collection of trails in the Tamar Valley, created by West Devon Borough Council and The Tamar Valley Area of Outstanding Natural Beauty with funding from a number of organisations including the Heritage Lottery Fund, the South West Regional Development Agency and Devon County Council. The Tamar Trails were built to allow access to the heritage and natural features of the valley via a series of new cycling and footpaths. The trails stretch 25 km across the Tamar Valley, taking in historic mines and woodland. The building work started in 2007 and finished in 2013 with a total investment of £7 million. A partnership of organisations own the trails which are managed by Tamar Community Trust. The trail passes wooded copses and disused mine workings and is used for walking, cycling, mountain biking, jogging or segway.

Natural beauty
The Valley was designated due to the natural beauty of its hills, valleys, forests, meadows and associated landscapes. The water has created good farmland and provides otters with a natural habitat. The birdlife includes avocets and wigeons.

Activities
There is canoeing, walking, horse riding, cycling, archery, a visitor centre with a cafe and tree surfing  Tamar Trails Parkrun takes place each week starting at the Tamar Trails visitor centre. There is a heritage train service on the scenic Tamar Valley Line, boat trips on the Tamar Passenger Ferry or river cruises from Plymouth.

References

Parks and open spaces in Devon
Parks and open spaces in Cornwall